"I Call It Love" is a song written by Bob McDill and recorded by American country music artist Mel McDaniel. It was released in December 1983 as the lead single from McDaniel's album Mel McDaniel with Oklahoma Wind. It peaked at number 9 on the U.S. Billboard Hot Country Singles & Tracks chart and number 29 on the Canadian RPM Country Tracks chart.

Chart performance

References

1983 singles
Mel McDaniel songs
Songs written by Bob McDill
Capitol Records Nashville singles
1983 songs